Aaron Douglas Ness (born May 18, 1990) is an American professional ice hockey defenseman who is currently under contract with the Hershey Bears of the American Hockey League (AHL). He was selected by the New York Islanders in the 2nd round (40th overall) of the 2008 NHL Entry Draft.

Playing career
Ness played High School hockey at Roseau High School in Roseau, Minnesota, and in 2008 he received the Minnesota Mr. Hockey award as the most outstanding senior high school hockey player in the state of Minnesota. In an effort to be able to play collegiate hockey one year earlier than projected, Ness accelerated his course load during his junior year of high school in order to graduate early. A combination of 8 classes at school as well as 3.5 credits online, however, did not stop him from leading his team to a fourth-place finish at the 2008 2A State Tournament. Ness then attended the University of Minnesota, where he played three seasons of NCAA Division I college hockey with the Minnesota Golden Gophers.

On March 16, 2011, the New York Islanders signed Ness to a three-year entry-level contract. In the 2014–15 season, Ness served as team captain of AHL affiliate, the Bridgeport Sound Tigers.

On July 1, 2015, Ness left the Islanders organization as a free agent and signed a one-year, two-way contract with the Washington Capitals. He later re-signed with the Capitals on May 16, 2018, to another one-year two-way contract.

The Capitals called Ness up from Hershey on November 8, 2018, together with fellow defenceman Jonas Siegenthaler, to be available to play against the Columbus Blue Jackets the next night at home in his first NHL game. Veteran Caps defencemen Brooks Orpik (injured reserve) and John Carlson (day-to-day) were both unavailable to play.

After four seasons within the Capitals organization, Ness left as a free agent to sign a two-year, two-way contract with the Arizona Coyotes on July 1, 2019.

Having left the Coyotes organization as a free agent, Ness was signed to a one-year AHL contract with the Providence Bruins on September 30, 2021, and was invited to the Boston Bruins training camp on a professional try-out. He was later signed to an AHL contract with affiliate, the Providence Bruins.

On July 5, 2022, Ness as a free agent, opted to continue his career in the AHL by returning to his former club, the Hershey Bears, on July 5, 2022.

Personal life 
Aaron's father, Jay, also grew up in Roseau and played collegiate hockey for the University of North Dakota. Jay was drafted in the 7th round of the 1982 draft by the Chicago Blackhawks.

Career statistics

Regular season and playoffs

International

Awards and honors

References

External links

1990 births
Living people
People from Roseau, Minnesota
American men's ice hockey defensemen
Arizona Coyotes players
Bridgeport Sound Tigers players
Hershey Bears players
Ice hockey players from Minnesota
Minnesota Golden Gophers men's ice hockey players
New York Islanders draft picks
New York Islanders players
Providence Bruins players
Tucson Roadrunners players
Washington Capitals players
Ice hockey players at the 2022 Winter Olympics
Olympic ice hockey players of the United States